Leaving Cheyenne is the second novel written by Pulitzer Prize-winning author Larry McMurtry.  The 1962 western portrays the lives of people living in Texas from about 1920 to about 1965.  

The book is written in three parts. Each is a first person account from the main characters involved in a life-long love triangle: Gideon, Johnny, and Molly. 

It was adapted into the 1974 drama film Lovin' Molly.

Western (genre) novels
1962 American novels
American novels adapted into films
Harper & Row books
Novels set in Texas